The Needle's Eye is a 1972 novel by British novelist Margaret Drabble. The novel was well received by reviewers, like contemporary novelist Joyce Carol Oates. Though it was her fifth novel, Drabble described it as her first time that she could "actually write a novel" expressing what she wanted to write.

Reception
Novelist Joyce Carol Oates gave a glowing review for the novel in the New York Times describing the novel as well surpassing the quality of her earlier works. Oates writes that The Needle's Eye was an "extraordinary work", transporting the reader into the "human and very extraordinary experience" of the characters.

Further reading

References

1972 British novels
Novels by Margaret Drabble
Novels set in London
Weidenfeld & Nicolson books